Enes Alić (born 3 September 1999) is a Bosnian football defender who plays for Hungarian club Kisvárda.

Career
On 30 January 2023, Alić moved to Kisvárda in Hungary.

References

1999 births
Living people
Footballers from Sarajevo
Association football fullbacks
Bosnia and Herzegovina footballers
FK Mladost Doboj Kakanj players
NK Domžale players
Kisvárda FC players
Premier League of Bosnia and Herzegovina players
Slovenian PrvaLiga players
Nemzeti Bajnokság I players
Bosnia and Herzegovina expatriate footballers
Expatriate footballers in the Czech Republic
Bosnia and Herzegovina expatriate sportspeople in the Czech Republic
Expatriate footballers in Slovenia
Bosnia and Herzegovina expatriate sportspeople in Slovenia
Expatriate footballers in Hungary
Bosnia and Herzegovina expatriate sportspeople in Hungary